Georgia State Route 25 Spur may refer to:

 Georgia State Route 25 Spur (Brunswick 1949–1960): a former spur route of State Route 25 that existed partially in the southern part of Brunswick
 Georgia State Route 25 Spur (Brunswick): a spur route of State Route 25 and part of the Golden Isles Parkway in the northwestern part of Brunswick
 Georgia State Route 25 Spur (Darien): a former spur route of State Route 25 that connected the southern part of Darien with Fort King George
 Georgia State Route 25 Spur (E): a spur route of State Route 25 is the unsigned designation for the F.J. Torras Causeway connecting Brunswick with St. Simons Island and Sea Island
 Georgia State Route 25 Spur (Savannah 1948–1969): a former spur route of State Route 25 that existed in the southern part of Savannah
 Georgia State Route 25 Spur (Savannah 1966–1986): a former spur route of State Route 25 that existed in the northern part of Savannah
 Georgia State Route 25 Spur (Woodbine): a spur route of State Route 25 that is a connector between I-95 and US 17/SR 25

025 Spur